CFMP-FM (107.7 MHz) is a commercial FM radio station in Arnprior, Ontario. It broadcasts a classic hits format branded as Oldies 107.7. The station is owned & operated by My Broadcasting Corporation.

History
The station originally began broadcasting as a repeater of CHMY-FM in Renfrew, as CHMY-FM-1 in 2005, in which My Broadcasting Corporation received approval from the CRTC to operate at 104.7 FM, later 107.7 MHz.

On April 2, 2014, My Broadcasting Corporation received approval from the CRTC to operate a new English-language FM radio station in Arnprior, which will operate at 107.7 FM and will replace CHMY-FM-1.

Undated, CHMY-FM-1 became CIMI-FM, and later CFMP-FM.

The CFMP-FM callsign was originally used at a radio station in Peterborough, which is now known as CKWF-FM.

The station originally had an adult contemporary format branded as 107.7 myFM with the slogan "Today's Soft Rock", on May 20, 2016, The station switched to an oldies format branded as Oldies 107.7.

References

External links
Oldies 107.7
CFMP-FM history - Canadian Communications Foundation

fmp
Hmy
Radio stations established in 2014
2014 establishments in Ontario
FMP